Bugandeh (also Romanized as Būgandeh) is a village in Mahur Berenji Rural District, Sardasht District, Dezful County, Khuzestan Province, Iran. At the 2006 census, its population was 27, in 4 families.

References 

Populated places in Dezful County